Kardo may refer to:
Kardo Bestilo (born 1976), Angolan writer
Kardo Ploomipuu (born 1988), Estonian swimmer
Cordău, village in Sânmartin Commune, Bihor County, Romania

See also
Cardo (disambiguation)
Kardos (surname)